This is a list of films produced by the Tollywood (Telugu language film industry) based in Hyderabad in the year 2004.

List of released films

January–June

July–December

References

2004
Telugu
 Telugu films
2004 in Indian cinema